George Grant (born 9 April 1956) is an Australian former rugby league footballer who played in the 1970s and 1980s.

Career
Originally from Crookwell, New South Wales but graded from Allawah, George Grant played seven seasons at St George Dragons between 1976 and 1982.

A prolific goal-kicker, George Grant won a premiership with St George Dragons, playing in the victorious 1979 team that defeated Canterbury-Bankstown. George Grant had a stellar season in 1979, scoring one try and kicking 104 goals. His career drew to a close at the end of the 1982 season.

References

St. George Dragons players
1956 births
Australian rugby league players
Living people
Rugby league second-rows
Rugby league players from New South Wales